Kinder is an unincorporated community in Stoddard County, in the U.S. state of Missouri.

History
A post office called Kinder was established in 1910, and remained in operation until 1963. The community has the name of James Kinder, the proprietor of a local sawmill.

References

Unincorporated communities in Stoddard County, Missouri
Unincorporated communities in Missouri
1910 establishments in Missouri